In mathematics, the Rogers polynomials, also called Rogers–Askey–Ismail polynomials and continuous q-ultraspherical polynomials, are a family of orthogonal polynomials introduced by  in the course of his work on the Rogers–Ramanujan identities. They are q-analogs of ultraspherical polynomials, and are the Macdonald polynomials for the special case of the A1 affine root system .

 and  discuss the properties of Rogers polynomials in detail.

Definition

The Rogers polynomials can be defined in terms of the q-Pochhammer symbol and the basic hypergeometric series by

where x = cos(θ).

References

Orthogonal polynomials
Q-analogs